Polybotrya andina is a species of fern in the family Dryopteridaceae. It is native to Ecuador and Peru.  Its natural habitats are subtropical or tropical moist lowland forests and subtropical or tropical moist montane forests. It is threatened by habitat loss.

References

Dryopteridaceae
Flora of Ecuador
Flora of Peru
Vulnerable flora of South America
Taxonomy articles created by Polbot